Proliferation may refer to:

Weapons
Nuclear proliferation, the spread of nuclear weapons, material, and technology
Chemical weapon proliferation, the spread of chemical weapons, material, and technology
Small arms proliferation, the spread of small weapons
Counter-proliferation, efforts to stop weapon proliferation

Computer science
License proliferation, a problem caused by incompatible software licenses
Data proliferation, the challenge of dealing with large amounts of data

Medicine and biology
Cell proliferation, cell growth and division
Proliferation, a phase of wound healing
Atypical small acinar proliferation, a concept in urologic pathology
Intravenous atypical vascular proliferation, a skin condition
Massive periretinal proliferation, a disease of the eye

Music
Proliferation (album), a 2008 album by Mike Reed's People, Places & Things

Other uses
Conceptual proliferation, a concept in Buddhism
Product proliferation, an organization's marketing of many variations of the same product

See also